Arthur Kill Rail Bridge may refer to either of two railroad bridges connecting New Jersey to Staten Island:

 Arthur Kill Bridge (1890–1959)
 Arthur Kill Vertical Lift Bridge (1959–present)